City on a Hill: It's Christmas Time, released on September 24, 2002, is the third album in the City on a Hill series of compilation albums by popular contemporary Christian musicians.

Track listing

References 

It's Christmas Time
2002 Christmas albums
Christmas compilation albums
2002 compilation albums